Freddie Freeloader is a 1990 studio album by Jon Hendricks.

Track listing
"Jumpin' at the Woodside" (Count Basie, Jon Hendricks) – 3:31
"In Summer" (Hendricks, Bruno Martino) – 5:48
"Freddie Freeloader" (Miles Davis, Hendricks) – 9:09
"Stardust" (Hoagy Carmichael, Mitchell Parish) – 3:55
"Sugar" (Maceo Pinkard, Stanley Turrentine) – 5:12
"Take the "A" Train" (Billy Strayhorn) – 3:04
"Fas' Livin' Blues" (Hendricks) – 5:37
"High As a Mountain" (Davis, Gil Evans, Hendricks) – 1:32
"Trinkle Tinkle" (Hendricks, Thelonious Monk) – 4:46
"Swing That Music" (Louis Armstrong, Horace Gerlach, Hendricks) – 2:55
"The Finer Things In Life" (Hendricks) – 2:33
"Listen to Monk" (Hendricks, Monk) – 6:36
"Sing Sing Sing" (Hendricks, Louis Prima) – 3:52

Personnel
Jon Hendricks - tenor saxophone, vocals, producer, liner notes, vocal arrangement
Kevin Burke - vocal
George Benson
Al Jarreau
Bobby McFerrin
Judith Hendricks - trumpet, vocal
Wynton Marsalis - trumpet
Randy Sandke
Lew Soloff
Joe Temperley - alto saxophone, baritone saxophone, tenor saxophone
Jerome Richardson - alto saxophone
Stanley Turrentine - tenor saxophone
Al Grey - trombone
Britt Woodman
Andy McCloud III - double bass
Tyler Mitchell
George Mraz
Rufus Reid
Clifford Barbaro - drums
Jimmy Cobb
Duffy Jackson
Romero Lubambo - guitar
Margaret Ross - harp
Tommy Flanagan - piano
Larry Golding
Barry Finclair - viola
Al Rogers - violin
Andy Stein
Ron McBee - percussion
Count Basie Orchestra
Mark Lopeman - conductor
Kiyomitsu Mihara - design, cover design
Brian Lee - engineer, mixing
Chaz Clifton - engineer
Josiah Cluck
Geoff Gillette
Josiah Gluck
Howard Johnston
Stan Wallace
Takao Homma - executive producer
Hiroyuki Hosaka - mastering
David Berger - arranger, conductor
Frank Foster - arranger, tenor saxophone, vocal

References 

Jon Hendricks albums
1990 albums
Denon Records albums